This is a list of notable individuals and organizations who have voiced their endorsement of Jo Jorgensen's campaign in the 2020 U.S. presidential election.

Members of Congress
 Justin Amash, US Representative from Michigan (2011–2021)

Municipal and local officials
 James P. Gray, former presiding judge of the Superior Court of Orange County, California, 2012 vice-presidential nominee of the Libertarian Party, and candidate for the 2020 Libertarian nomination for president

International political figures
 Alex Vanopslagh, Leader of the Danish Liberal Alliance (2019–present), Member of the Folketing (2019–present) (Liberal Alliance)

Business executives and leaders
 Peter Schiff, stock broker, financial commentator, radio personality

Activists and public figures
 Ken Bone, political activist (previously endorsed Andrew Yang)
 Jacob Hornberger, founder and President of the Future of Freedom Foundation, candidate for president in 2000 and 2020
 Gary Nolan, radio host, candidate for the Libertarian presidential nomination in 2004

Commentators, writers, and columnists
 Peter Bagge, cartoonist
 Nick Gillespie, editor-at-large of Reason
 Jack Hunter, radio host, political commentator, Politics Editor for Rare.us
 Jeff Jacoby, Boston Globe columnist
 John Stossel, journalist, Libertarian pundit
 Jacob Sullum, columnist and senior editor of Reason
 Jesse Walker, books editor of Reason
 Matt Welch, editor-at-large and former editor-in-chief of Reason

Political parties
 Alaska Libertarian Party
 Libertarian Party of Alabama
 Libertarian Party of Arkansas
 Libertarian Party of Connecticut
 Libertarian Party of Delaware
 Libertarian Party of Hawaii
 Libertarian Party of Kansas
 Libertarian Party of Kentucky
 Libertarian Party of Louisiana
 Libertarian Party of Maine
 Libertarian Party of Maryland
 Libertarian Party of Massachusetts
 Libertarian Party of Mississippi
 Libertarian Party of Missouri
 Libertarian Party of Montana
 Libertarian Party of New Hampshire
 Libertarian Party of New Mexico
 Libertarian Party of New York
 Libertarian Party of North Carolina
 Libertarian Party of North Dakota
 Libertarian Party of Ohio
 Libertarian Party of Oklahoma
 Libertarian Party of Oregon
 Libertarian Party of Pennsylvania
 Libertarian Party of Rhode Island
 Libertarian Party of South Dakota
 Libertarian Party of Texas
 Libertarian Party of Vermont
 Libertarian Party of Virginia
 Libertarian Party of Washington
 Libertarian Party of West Virginia
 New Jersey Libertarian Party

See also
 Endorsements in the 2020 Democratic Party presidential primaries
 News media endorsements in the 2020 United States presidential primaries
 List of Joe Biden 2020 presidential campaign endorsements
 List of Donald Trump 2020 presidential campaign endorsements
 List of Howie Hawkins 2020 presidential campaign endorsements

References 

2020 United States presidential election endorsements
Lists of United States presidential candidate endorsements
2020 Libertarian Party (United States) presidential campaigns